In sports, a reserve team is a team composed of players under contract to a club but who do not normally play in matches for the first team. Reserve teams often include back-up players from the first team, young players who need playing time to improve their skills, as well as members of the first team recovering from injury. In some countries, reserve or development teams compete in entirely separate competitions from first teams, while some countries allow reserve teams or farm teams to compete in the same league system as their club's first team, although usually in separate divisions.

In association football
Reserve teams usually consist of a combination of emerging youth players and first-team squad players. These teams are distinct from a club's youth team, which usually consists of players under a certain age and plays in an age-specific league. In England, Argentina and the United States the term reserve is commonly used to describe these teams. In Germany and Austria the terms Amateure or II is used, while B team is used in the Spanish football league system, the Czech Republic, Slovakia, and Portugal. In Norway, these teams are distinguished by a 2. In the Netherlands, the adjective Jong is commonly used

In England reserve teams of professional clubs play in completely separate leagues and competitions such as the Professional Development League or the Central League, although further down the pyramid, reserve clubs feature in the same system as their parent clubs and can be promoted through the system. They cannot usually play in the same division as their parent team.

However, in other countries, reserve teams play in the same football league as their senior team and have competed in the domestic cup competitions. In Spain this has seen the reserve team of CD Málaga change identity and play in La Liga while Castilla CF, the reserve team of Real Madrid, reached the Copa del Rey final, qualified for the European Cup Winners' Cup and won the Segunda División.

France
In France, the reserve teams of professional clubs playing in Ligue 1, Ligue 2 or National is restricted to play in fourth-tier Championnat National 2 if the club has a youth center or in fifth-tier Championnat National 3 if a team doesn't has a youth center. Reserve teams have not been allowed to play the Coupe de France to serve the non-reserve team's interests.

However, if the first team plays or get relegated in the fourth-tiered National 2, the reserve team is restricted to a fifth-tiered level.

If a reserve team finishes first in his National 2 group, the promotion is awarded to the second. Additionally, if a reserve team finishes first in his National 3 group but the club doesn't have a youth center, the promotion instead awarded to the second.

Some clubs even have C or D-sides that play at regional or district levels.

E-sides
 Les Herbiers (District 4, Vendée, Group D)
 Pouzauges Bocage (District 5, Vendée, Group G)
 Arques (District 7, Cote d'Opale, Group C)
 US Gravelines (District 5, Flandres, Group A)
 AS Steenvoorde (District 5, Flandres, Group C)
 Calais Beau-Marais (District 7, Cote Opale, Group A)
 Jeunesse Longuesse (District 7, Cote Opale, Group D)

Germany

In Germany, Hertha BSC II, the reserve team of Hertha Berlin, reached the 1992–93 DFB-Pokal final after their first team were eliminated in the Round of 16. They lost the final 1–0 to Bayer Leverkusen. In the German football league system, however, reserve teams are not allowed to be promoted above the 3. Liga and since 2008–09 have not been allowed to play in the cup competition to serve the non-reserve team's interests. In the 2003–04 season, Bayern Munich's reserve team won the Regionalliga Süd, a semi-professional league then in the third tier of German football (now the fourth), finishing nine points clear of the second-placed FC Rot-Weiß Erfurt. Due to the rule which prohibits one club from having two teams in fully professional leagues, the third-placed 1. FC Saarbrücken was promoted to the Second Bundesliga instead.

Italy
In 2018, the Italian Football Federation allowed the possibility for Serie A teams to register a reserve Under-23 team in the third-tier Serie C league, with only Juventus taking that opportunity. Juventus Next Gen is, as of 2022–23, still the only reserve team playing in the Italian national leagues.

Japan

From the days of the old Japan Soccer League, Japan allowed reserve teams to play in the main league system. Even today reserve teams of J. League clubs are allowed to compete in the Emperor's Cup.

Japan Soccer League reserve teams
These teams were never promoted to the top flight due to their senior squad's presence there.
Toyo Industries/Mazda: Mazda Auto Hiroshima
Furukawa Electric: Furukawa Electric Chiba
Yomiuri Soccer Club: Yomiuri S.C. Juniors
Yanmar Diesel: Yanmar Club

Reserve clubs were usually localized in the same city as their senior team and should not be confused with clubs from sister companies within a keiretsu or otherwise, which were separate clubs competing for the same championships. An example is Toyota Automated Loom Works, founding member of the JSL in 1965, later relegated and now competing in the Aichi Prefecture league, and Toyota Motors, now known as Nagoya Grampus, founding member and mainstay of the J. League.

J. League reserve teams today
Most J. League reserve teams these days are in the corresponding regional league. The most successful is JEF United Ichihara Chiba Reserves, who compete in the national third division, the Japan Football League. (Furukawa Electric Chiba still exists but is no longer affiliated with the JEF club.)

Norway

In Norway, reserve football teams are permitted to participate at all levels of league football except for the two highest divisions, making the 2. divisjon the highest league they can enter. However, if the first team plays in the second-tiered 1. divisjon, the reserve team is restricted to a fourth-tier league, maintaining a league difference of two. Reserve teams bear the same name as their respective first teams with a "2" attached as a suffix. If a reserve team ends the season in a promotion spot to a league it cannot enter, that promotion is instead awarded to the best following team.

Scotland
Scotland has two reserve leagues under the umbrella of the SPFL Reserve League, where 27 of the senior clubs competed in its first year, only for several (including Celtic and Rangers) withdrew to pursue their own programme of fixtures. The predecessor was the SPFL Development League until 2018. It was described as a development league for under-20s, but teams could field up to five over-age players in each game. 

Reserve teams (limited to under-21 players) of the clubs in the Scottish Premiership enter the Scottish Challenge Cup for lower division clubs (and some entrants from other parts of the British Isles). Proposals have been made by the bigger clubs to have 'B teams' placed into the Scottish football league system, but as of 2020 these have been rejected.

South Korea
The South-Korean R League serves as a dedicated competition for reserve teams and has been intermittently active since 1990, with several interruptions and format changes throughout its history. In its current form, the league has been played since 2016.

Spain

Reserve teams in Spain play in the same league pyramid as their parent club but may not play in the same division. Since 1990 reserve teams are restricted to play in Copa del Rey.

Segunda División
In 1951–52 CD Mestalla, the reserve team of Valencia CF, won the Segunda División promotion play-off but were denied promotion because their senior team was already in the Primera División. The following season CD España Industrial, the reserve team of FC Barcelona, also finished as runners-up in the same play-off but were similarly denied. However, after winning another promotion play-off in 1956, España Industrial separated from FC Barcelona and were renamed CD Condal. The club were now able to be promoted to the Primera División. However, they survived only one season and were relegated in 1957. In 1968 the club rejoined the FC Barcelona family as the reserve team and eventually evolved into FC Barcelona B.

In 1983–84 Castilla CF and Bilbao Athletic, the reserve teams of Real Madrid and Athletic Bilbao respectively, finished as winners and runners-up of the Segunda División. Castilla, Bilbao Athletic and Atlético Madrid B finished third in 1987–88, 1989–90 and 1998–99 respectively. In normal circumstances, these teams would have all been promoted except for the fact that their senior team was already in the Primera División.

Special cases

Castilla CF in Copa del Rey
In 1980 Castilla CF also reached the Copa del Rey final and qualified for the European Cup Winners' Cup. During their cup run, they beat four Primera División teams including Hércules CF, Athletic Bilbao, Real Sociedad and Sporting de Gijón. The latter two eventually finished second and third in the Primera División. In the final they played Real Madrid but lost 6–1. However, because Real also won La Liga, Castilla CF qualified for European Cup Winners' Cup. Despite beating West Ham United 3–1 in the opening game at the Bernabéu, they lost the return 5–1 and went out in the first round.

Málaga CF
Málaga CF was originally formed in 1948 as Atlético Malagueño, the reserve team of CD Málaga. In 1992 CD Málaga was disbanded and two years later Atlético Malagueño were relaunched as Málaga CF. They were eventually promoted to the Primera División in 1999.

Thailand

There was a Reserve League in the Thai Premier League from 2016 onwards.

Ukraine

In Ukraine, there are two types of reserve teams, one doubles and the other  or second teams. The second teams compete in regular league competitions usually in the Ukrainian Second League or lower, some better have competed in the Ukrainian First League (such as FC Dynamo-2 Kyiv). Also some smaller clubs voluntarily would join bigger club as its farm (Ternopil-Nyva-2, Poltava-2 Karlivka, others), while other would be forced to be revived anew as the original club would be changed into a new better club. On rare occasions in the professional league competitions were allowed to compete some clubs' academies (Sports school of Olympic Reserve (SSOR) Metalurh, FC Dnipro-75 Dnipropetrovsk, others). Until 1999 second teams and third teams were allowed to compete in the Ukrainian Cup. 

Since 1999–2000 in Ukraine started to talk about reviving some kind of separate competition for such teams or youth competitions. In 2004 there was organized competition for the Vyshcha Liha teams doubles. Some doubles were formed out of already existing second  teams, other clubs kept their second teams as well as created additional doubles. It certainly reduced the number of second teams in regular league competitions as well eliminated some farm clubs. In 2008, championship among doubles was transitioned to youth competition (under-21) as Vyshcha Liha was also transformed into Premier Liha. In 2012, there was introduced additional competition in Premier Liha, the under-19 championship (see Ukrainian Premier League Reserves and Under 19). All these youth competitions "cleaned" the lower league structure of the second teams, but some clubs continue field them at national or regional levels.

In Ukraine, second teams act same as farm teams and they do not have an age restriction as youth teams. Second teams are not allowed to compete in the same division with their primary team (senior team). On several occasions, the second team of Dynamo Kyiv (Dynamo-2 Kyiv) won the Ukrainian First League, but was not allowed to be promoted to premiers where the primary team of Dynamo Kyiv competes due to the rule. As any rules there are some exceptions, the second team of FC Nyva Ternopil (FC Ternopil) were allowed promotion to the same division after it lost its affiliation with the main club and promoted to professional ranks starting again from regional competitions.

As it was mentioned above, farm teams in Ukraine are not necessary denoted with 2 (or 3), but could be a separate club that have an agreement with another club. Among examples there are FC Karlivka that used to be called FC Poltava-2 (the second team of FC Poltava), FC Kalush was known as LUKOR Kalush and Prykarpattia Kalush (the second team of FC Spartak Ivano-Frankivsk), FC Krasyliv was known as FC Krasyliv-Obolon as the second team of FC Obolon Kyiv, and there are other examples.

List of all second teams (competed at national competitions): FC Dynamo-2 Kyiv (FC Dynamo-3 Kyiv), FC Shakhtar-2 Donetsk (FC Shakhtar-3 Donetsk), FC Dnipro-2 Dnipropetrovsk (FC Dnipro-3 Dnipropetrovsk), FC Karpaty-2 Lviv (FC Karpaty-3 Lviv), FC Chornomorets-2 Odesa, FC Metalist-2 Kharkiv (FC Metalist-3 Kharkiv), FC Vorskla-2 Poltava, FC Metalurh-2 Zaporizhzhia (SSOR Metalurh Zaporizhzhia), FC Kryvbas-2 Kryvyi Rih (FC Kryvbas-Ruda Kryivyi Rih), FC Metalurh-2 Donetsk, FC Arsenal-2 Kyiv, FC Illichivets-2 Mariupol, FC Zirka-2 Kirovohrad, FC Polihraftekhnika-2 Oleksandriya, FC Prykarpattia-2 Ivano-Frankivsk, FC Zakarpattia-2 Uzhhorod, FC Obolon-2 Kyiv, FC Nyva-2 Vinnytsia, FC Kharkiv-2, MFC Mykolaiv-2, FC Stal-2 Alchevsk, FC Bukovyna-2 Chernivtsi, FC Sevastopol-2, FC Borysfen-2 Boryspil, FC Lviv, FC Naftovyk-2 Okhtyrka, FC Desna-2 Chernihiv, FC Spartak Molodizhne, FC Avanhard-2 Kramatorsk.

United States

Major League Soccer, the highest level of competition in the United States, ran its own reserve league from 2005 to 2014. Beginning in 2014, the second-tier league now known as the USL Championship began accepting affiliated MLS club teams, such as LA Galaxy II and Seattle Sounders FC 2, into their league with special rules as a result of a partnership signed with MLS. This arrangement was later extended to USL League One (USL1), a third-level league also operated by the United Soccer League, but several MLS teams never fielded a reserve side in either USL league. In 2022, MLS is relaunching its reserve league as MLS Next Pro, which occupies the same level as USL1. The first season will feature 21 teams, all but one of which are MLS reserve sides. All remaining MLS teams except CF Montréal have announced plans to place reserve sides in Next Pro by 2023.

The term is analogous to junior varsity, a concept in high school and college sports which serves the same purpose in American football, basketball, and other sports to give players not usually featured in the first team, or varsity, playing time and experience.

See also

 Australian Football League reserves affiliations
 National Rugby League reserves affiliations
 Farm team
 Scout team, team that practices against the main roster

References

External links 
Remarkable Reserves!
FA Premier Reserve League North
FA Premier Reserve League South
Central League
MLS Next Pro
PSL Reserve League

 
Association football terminology
American football terminology
Australian rules football terminology
Basketball terminology
Rugby league terminology
Rugby union terminology